Kalisz railway station is a railway station in Kalisz, in the Greater Poland Voivodeship, Poland. The station opened in 1902 and is located on the Łódź–Forst (Lausitz) railway. The train services are operated by PKP and Polregio.

History
The station was built in 1902 as the final stop of the Warsaw–Kalisz Railway. In 1906, a line was added to Nowe Skalmierzyce, the border crossing between the Russian-controlled Vistula Land and the German Empire. In the past numerous international trains departed from Kalisz, to destinations such as Moscow, Baku, Prague, Frankfurt, Dresden, Paris, Ostend and Calais. Even in the late twentieth century Kalisz can be reached abroad. The last international train services was "Bohemia" (Warsaw - Wroclaw - Pardubice - Prague).

Modernisation
The station building was to be upgraded before the Euro 2012. However, due to contract issues and delays the renovations were not completed until November 2015. The modernised station was opened on 27 November 2015.

Train services
The station is served by the following service(s):

 Intercity services (IC) Wrocław Główny — Łódź — Warszawa Wschodnia
Intercity services (IC) Białystok - Warszawa - Łódź - Ostrów Wielkopolski - Wrocław
Intercity services (IC) Ełk - Białystok - Warszawa - Łódź - Ostrów Wielkopolski - Wrocław
 Intercity services (IC) Zgorzelec - Legnica - Wrocław - Ostrów Wielkopolski - Łódź - Warszawa
Intercity services Jelenia Gora - Wroclaw - Ostrow Wielkopolski - Kalisz - Lodz - Warsaw - Lublin/Bialystok* InterRegio services (IR) Ostrów Wielkopolski — Łódź — Warszawa Główna
 InterRegio services (IR) Poznań Główny — Ostrów Wielkopolski — Łódź — Warszawa Główna
 Regiona services (PR) Łódź Kaliska — Ostrów Wielkopolski 
 Regional services (PR) Łódź Kaliska — Ostrów Wielkopolski — Poznań Główny

Bus services
A
9

References
Station article at kolej.one.pl

 This article is based upon a translation of the Polish language version as of July 2016.

External links
 

Railway stations in Poland opened in 1902
Railway stations in Greater Poland Voivodeship
Railway stations served by Przewozy Regionalne InterRegio
Railway station